Sleep No More ("La regola del buio") is a 2002 novel by author Greg Iles in which John Waters, the protagonist, finds the lives of his wife and child in jeopardy when the soul of a lover he had 20 years ago appears in the body of a female stranger in Natchez, Mississippi. Part mystery, part thriller, part romance, the book probes the concepts of pathological jealousy and transmigration of the soul.

References
 

2002 American novels